Joe Harris is an American comic book writer and screenwriter. He made his big screen debut in 2003 with his screenplay for the Sony Pictures release Darkness Falls. He is currently the writer of the ongoing monthly comic book series Great Pacific from Image Comics and The X-Files: Season 10 from IDW Publishing.

Career
In film, Harris' screenplay for Darkness Falls was based on Tooth Fairy, his short film which presented a horrific twist on the children’s bedtime myth. He wrote the politically themed slasher film The Tripper which featured David Arquette as writer and director.

In comics, Harris has written for many major publishers, writing X-Men, Spider-Man, and Batman.

Harris has various creator-owned projects. In 2010 Oni Press released the five-issue miniseries Ghost Projekt, written by Harris and illustrated by Steve Rolston. In 2011 Oni Press published Harris' miniseries, Spontaneous in 2011 with Brett Weldele. In mid- 2013, Oni Press released Harris' hardcover graphic novel Wars in Toyland, which is illustrated by Adam Pollina. In 2012, with Image Comics, Harris and artist Martin Morazzo premiered the ongoing series, Great Pacific.

Harris replaced Gail Simone as the writer on The Fury of Firestorm for DC Comics as part of The New 52, DC's 2011 reboot of its superhero continuity and comic book line. He wrote issues #0 and #7-12.

In March 2013, IDW Publishing and Twentieth Century Fox Consumer Products announced that Harris would be the writer of The X-Files: Season 10, an in-continuity monthly comic book series executive produced by X-Files creator Chris Carter.  The premiere issue debuted on June 19, 2013.

Bibliography

Aftershock
Disaster Inc. #1- (upcoming, 2020)

Dark Horse
B.P.R.D.: There's Something Under My Bed (2003)
Creepy #1, #3 (2009, 2010)

DC/Wildstorm
Batman: The Dark Knight #6, #8 (2012)
The Batman Chronicles #19 (2000)
Batman: Battle for the Cowl: Man-Bat (2009)
Batman: Joker's Asylum: Scarecrow (2008)
Cybernary 2.0 #1-6 (2001)
DCU Halloween Special '09 (2009)
DCU Halloween Special '10 (2010)
Firestorm: The Nuclear Men #0, #7-12 (2012)

Dynamite Entertainment
Alice Cooper #1-5 (2014-2015)
Vampirella And The Scarlet Legion #1-5 (2011) 
Vampirella vs. Dracula #1-3 (2012)

Image Comics
Great Pacific #1-18 (2012-2014)
Rockstars #1-Present (2016–Present)
Snowfall #1-9 (2016-2017)

IDW Publishing
Millennium #1-5 (2015)
The X-Files: Season 10 #1-25  (2013-2015)
The X-Files: Season 11  #1-8  (2015-2016)
The X-Files #1-17 (2016-2017)
The X-Files: X-Mas Special 2014 (2014)
The X-Files: X-Mas Special 2015 (2015)
The X-Files: X-Mas Special 2016 (2016)

Marvel Comics
Bishop: The Last X-Man #1-15 (1999-2000)
Generation X Annual 1998 (1998)
Generation X Holiday Special (1998)
Slingers #0-12 (ongoing) (1998-1999)
Spider-Man vs. Punisher #1 (2000)
Uncanny X-Men #358 (1998)
X-Factor #147 (1998)
X-Force #77, #101 (1998, 2000)
X-Men Unlimited #20 (1998)
X-Men: Liberators#1-4 (1998-1999)
X-Men: The Search for Cyclops #1-4 (2000-2001)

Oni Press
Ghost Projekt #1-5  (2010)
Spontaneous #1-5 (2011)
Wars in Toyland Graphic Novel (2013)

Valiant Entertainment
Armor Hunters: Bloodshot #1-3 (2014)
Divinity III: Aric, Son of the Revolution #1 (2017)

References

External links

 Official site
 
 
 Official MySpace

American comics writers
Living people
American male screenwriters
Year of birth missing (living people)